Privation is the absence or lack of basic necessities.

Child psychology
In child psychology, privation occurs when a child has no opportunity to form a relationship with a parent figure, or when such relationship is distorted, due to their treatment. It is different to deprivation, which occurs when an established relationship is severed. It is understood that privation can produce social, emotional and intellectual problems for children; however, how inevitable such problems become as a result of privation, and the extent to which they can be reversed, remains an issue of debate among psychologists.

Philosophy
In philosophy, privation may refer to the absence of a necessary quality in the universe.

For example, as part of his theodicy, Augustine denied the existence of evil as its own entity; rather, he described evil as a privation, or going wrong, of good, privatio boni.

Jewish philosopher Maimonides argued that privation is not necessarily a bad thing: it would be trivial to regard the privation of hair – baldness – as an evil.

References

Developmental psychology